Jahangir Mohammad Adel (died 13 November 2014) was a Bangladesh Nationalist Party and Jatiya Party politician. He was the Member of Parliament (MP) for Dhaka-12 from 1979 to 1982 and MP for Dhaka-7 from 1986 to 1988. He was Deputy Mayor of Dhaka.

Career
He was the deputy Mayor of Dhaka. On 14 August 2000, Kamal Hossain, a Bangladesh Awami League leader, was shot dead outside Adels house after protesting the raising of Pakistan's flag on Pakistan Day in Adels house in Old Dhaka. Adels son was arrested by the police regarding the murder. His sons were acquitted in 2003 in the case. He was a former presidium member of Jatiya Party.

Death
Adel died on 13 November 2014.

References

Jatiya Party politicians
2014 deaths
2nd Jatiya Sangsad members
3rd Jatiya Sangsad members
Bangladesh Nationalist Party politicians